This is a list of conservation organisations that primarily aim to protect species, their habitats, and ecosystems.

List of international conservation organisations 
African Wild Dog Conservancy - dedicated to conserving the African wild dog
African Wildlife Foundation - ensuring that wildlife and wild lands thrive in modern Africa 
Bat Conservation International - working to conserve the world's bats and their habitats
BirdLife International - a global partnership of organisations that strive to conserve birds
Center for Biological Diversity - protecting endangered species through legal action, petitions, media and activism
Conservation International - secure the critical benefits that nature provides to humanity
Durrell Wildlife Conservation Trust - mission to save species from extinction
EcoHealth Alliance - protecting the health of people, animals, and the environment from emerging infectious diseases
Frankfurt Zoological Society (FZS)
Fauna and Flora International - safeguard the future of southern Africa's large mammal populations
Greenpeace - raising environmental issues to public knowledge
International Anti-Poaching Foundation - created a structured military-like approach to conservation in Africa
International Union for Conservation of Nature - a partnership of 1400 organisations working in the field of nature conservation
National Audubon Society - non-profit environmental organisation dedicated to conservation
Ocean Conservancy - formulate ocean policy based on saving ocean.
Planet Protectors- Preserves trees, plants trees, did the #planthundredtreeschallenge, spreads awareness about animals.
Rainforest Action Network - preserves forests, protects the climate and upholds human rights
Rainforest Alliance - provision of an environmental certification on forestry and agriculture
Rainforest Foundation Fund - preserving rainforest by defending the rights of the indigenous peoples
Rainforest Foundation UK - preserving rainforest by defending the rights of the indigenous peoples
Rainforest Partnership - links communities in Latin American rainforests to partner communities in the United States
Rainforest Trust - focused on the purchase of tropical lands
Rare - helps communities adopt sustainable behaviors toward their environment
The Nature Conservancy - largest environmental nonprofit by assets and revenue in the world.
Wildlife Conservation Network - protecting endangered species and preserving their natural habitats.
Wildlife Conservation Society - saves wildlife and wild places worldwide with programs in 60 countries; also manages five New York City wildlife parks including the Bronx Zoo
World Wide Fund for Nature, also known as World Wildlife Fund - international conservation
Zoological Society of London - devoted to the worldwide conservation of animals and their habitats

List of national or local conservation organisations
Ancient Forest Alliance - conserving old growth forests in British Columbia, Canada
Appalachian Trail Conservancy - Appalachian National Scenic Trail from Maine to Georgia
Blue Mountains Conservation Society - NGO, conservation of Greater Blue Mountains area in Australia
BirdLife Australia - Australian ornithological conservation organisation
California Coastal Conservancy - government agency that manages coastline resources
Central Park Conservancy - manages 843 acre Central Park under a contract with City of New York
Comunidad Inti Wara Yassi - Bolivian non-governmental organisation
Conservancy Association - Hong Kong's oldest non-governmental environmental organisation
Conservancy of Southwest Florida
Conserving Carolina 
Defenders of Wildlife - works to protect all native animals and plants throughout North America
Department of Conservation (New Zealand)
Ducks Unlimited
European Wildlife
Federal Agency for Nature Conservation - German
Great Swamp Watershed Association
Indian Council of Forestry Research and Education
Izaak Walton League of America - devoted to conservation in the United States
The Land Conservancy of British Columbia (TLC) - land trust modeled after the National Trust of Britain
Live Ocean - New Zealand Marine conservation charity
Miami Conservancy District - Ohio agency that manages flood control of the Great Miami River
National Trust of Britain
National Wildlife Federation - conservation education and advocacy for Northern American Wildlife
Nature Conservancy of Canada - help protect Canada's most important lands, waters and wildlife
North China Institute of Water Conservancy and Hydroelectric Power - Chinese public university
Open Space Institute - conservation organisation and think tank in the Eastern United States
Pheasants Forever
Point Blue Conservation Science - advancing conservation through bird and ecosystem research
Pro Natura - 650 nature reserves in Switzerland (250 square kilometers)
Rails-to-Trails Conservancy (RTC) - converted 13,150 miles (21,160 km) of former rail lines to trails
Santa Lucia Conservancy - land trust and conservation community protecting 18,000 acres in California
Santa Monica Mountains Conservancy - dedicated to the acquisition of land for conservation in California
Sierra Nevada Conservancy - state conservancy in California
Ukraine Nature Conservation Society
Sierra Club
The Conservation Fund - to pursue environmental preservation and economic development in the United States
Theodore Roosevelt Conservation Partnership
Western Pennsylvania Conservancy - 200,000 acres (800 km²)
Whaleman Foundation - protection of cetaceans
Wild Salmon Center - identifies and protects the best salmon ecosystems of the Pacific Rim 
Wildlife Research and Conservation Trust - undertakes field research to promote the conservation of wildlife in India
Wolf River Conservancy - protects the Wolf River in Tennessee
 Tanzania Environmental Conservation Society (TECOSO Tanzania) - advancing environmental preservation, social and economic development sustainability in Tanzania

Cave conservancies 
To see organisations that are specialized land trusts managing caves and karst features in the United States, refer to Cave conservancies.

See also 
 List of environmental organizations
 List of population concern organizations

Conservation
Conservation